Shyamal may refer to:

People
Shyamal Bagchee(born 1945), Canadian poet, academic, and erotic photo artist 
Shyamal Bashak (born 1967), Bangladeshi artist
Shyamal Bose (born 1963), Indian film director, actor and screenwriter
Shyamal Datta (born 1941), Indian police officer and politician
Shyamal Gangapadhyay (1933–2001), Bengali novelist and editor
Shyamal Mitra (1929–1987), Indian composer, singer and film producer
Shyamal Mondal, Indian politician
Shyamal Kumar Sen (born 1940), Indian politician
Shyamal Sinha (1930–1963), Indian cricketer and cricket coach